Francisco Infante-Arana, born 1943 in Vasilievka, Saratov Oblast, Soviet Union) is a Russian artist.

Background
Francisco Infante-Arana was born to a Spanish father and Russian mother, who raised him. Eventually he moved to Moscow and enrolled in the Moscow College of Decorative and Applied Arts. In the 1960s and early 1970s, he was a member of the artists' collective known as the Movement Group, founded by Lev Nussberg. He was and continues to be one of the premier Russian avant-garde artists. Some of his work is currently on display at the Cold War Modern exhibition at the V & A in London.

Work's holders
 International Symposium in the Urals (1989), in Nepal (Kathmandu), Tibet (Lhasa, 2000), on Lake - (artists Francisco Infante-Arana and Nonna Goryunova,  Alexander Evgenievich Ponomarev, Vladimir Nasedkin, Tatiana Badanina, Tishkov, Leonid, Shaburov, Alexander E., Porto, Ivan B., Chernyshev, Aristarchus A., Vladislav Yefimov, Batynkov, Konstantin, Olga Chernysheva)

External links
 Biographies: , .
 Photos of  Infante-Arana's works: , .

1943 births
Living people
20th-century Russian painters
Russian male painters
21st-century Russian painters
Soviet Nonconformist Art
Russian avant-garde
Russian people of Spanish descent
Soviet artists
Soviet people of Spanish descent
20th-century Russian male artists
21st-century Russian male artists